Svend Valdemar Iversen (17 October 1913 – 17 December 1985) was a Danish sailor. He competed in the 6 Metre event at the 1948 Summer Olympics.

References

External links
 

1913 births
1985 deaths
Danish male sailors (sport)
Olympic sailors of Denmark
Sailors at the 1948 Summer Olympics – 6 Metre
Sportspeople from Aarhus